Chadayamangalam is a legislative assembly constituency in the south-eastern area of Kollam district in Kerala, India. It is one among the 11 assembly constituencies in the district. As of the 2021 assembly elections, the current MLA is J. Chinchu Rani of CPI.

Structure
As per the recent changes on assembly constituency delimitations, the Chadayamangalam assembly constituency consists of Alayamon Panchayat in Punalur Taluk and Chadayamangalam, Chithara, Elamad, Ittiva, Kadakkal, Nilamel and Velinalloor Panchayats in Kottarakkara Taluk.

Electoral history

Travancore-Cochin Legislative Assembly Elections

Members of Legislative Assembly 
The following list contains all members of Kerala legislative assembly who have represented the constituency:

Key

Election results 
Percentage change (±%) denotes the change in the number of votes from the immediate previous election.

Niyamasabha Election 2016 
There were 1,96,733 registered voters in the constituency for the 2016 Kerala Niyamasabha Election.

Niyamasabha Election 2011 
There were 1,77,610 registered voters in the constituency for the 2011 election.

References

Assembly constituencies of Kerala
Government of Kollam
Politics of Kollam district
Assembly constituencies in Kollam district
1957 establishments in Kerala
Constituencies established in 1957